John David Moffitt (born October 28, 1986) is a former American football offensive guard who played in the National Football League (NFL). He was drafted by the Seattle Seahawks in the third round of the 2011 NFL Draft. He played college football at the University of Wisconsin. Moffitt also played for the Denver Broncos and Philadelphia Eagles.

High school career 
Moffitt attended Notre Dame High School in West Haven, Connecticut, US, where he was a two-time all-conference choice as a two-way lineman. As a senior, he made 65 tackles and registered seven QB sacks in 2005. Regarded as a three-star recruit by Rivals.com, he was listed as the No. 13 prospect from the New England region.

College career 
Moffitt was a 2010 All-American selection by Associated Press, CBSSports.com, and Rivals.com at the University of Wisconsin.

While some have heralded John's ability to run block, many red flags have been raised about his pass blocking skills. According to sidelinescouting.com, Moffitt is "not very fast" and "lacks real quickness", raising questions about his longevity as an American football guard or center.

Professional career

Seattle Seahawks 
Moffitt was drafted number 75 overall by the Seattle Seahawks in the 2011 NFL Draft. Moffitt started nine games in the 2011 season before being injured in the week-13 game against the Baltimore Ravens. His career took a further downside when hit with a four-game suspension for using performance-enhancing drugs 

Moffitt was traded to the Cleveland Browns on August 19, 2013. On August 20, 2013, the trade was rescinded, reportedly due to Moffitt failing his physical. In an interview with 710 ESPN Seattle, Moffitt claimed that Cleveland wanted him to take less money to play there and when he said he wouldn't do that they told him that they were going to fail his physical.

Denver Broncos 
On August 20, 2013, Moffitt was traded to the Denver Broncos in exchange for defensive tackle Sealver Siliga. Moffitt retired from the NFL on November 5, 2013. He stated that he was unhappy, and did not want to risk his health for money. He was not on the roster when the Broncos made the Super Bowl, the game in which they lost to his former team, the Seahawks. Moffitt said during his retirement that he didn't care about the upcoming Super Bowl anyway.

Philadelphia Eagles 
Moffitt signed a one-year deal with the Eagles on June 29, 2015.  He was cut by the Eagles on September 4, 2015.

Personal life 
During his time with the Seahawks, Moffitt had several run-ins at Bellevue Square, Lincoln Square and the Eastside’s other Kemper Properties, from which Moffitt was banned in early 2012. After the ban, he was arrested on June 14, 2012, for allegedly urinating on a parked car near Bellevue Square mall, and was caught trespassing again that August at Lincoln Square’s Paddy Coyne’s bar. Moffitt was also charged with drug possession and battery in 2014.

References

External links 
 Wisconsin Badgers profile
 Seattle Seahawks profile

1986 births
Living people
People from Guilford, Connecticut
American football offensive guards
Wisconsin Badgers football players
Seattle Seahawks players
Denver Broncos players
Philadelphia Eagles players
Players of American football from Connecticut
Sportspeople from New Haven County, Connecticut